Gillian Miniter is an American silver-medallist World Champion bridge player. She came second in the Mixed Teams event in Wroclaw in 2022.

Bridge accomplishments

Runners-up
 World Bridge Series Mixed Teams (1) 2022

 North American Bridge Championships (1)
 Grand National Teams (1) 2019

References

External links
 
 

American contract bridge players
Living people
Year of birth missing (living people)
Place of birth missing (living people)